Pari Chata (Aymara pari red hot, Pukina chata mountain, "red hot mountain", also spelled Parichata) is a  mountain in the Andes in Bolivia. It is located in the Cordillera de los Frailes in the Potosí Department, Tomás Frías Province, Yocalla Municipality, north of the river Pillku Mayu ("red river").

See also
 Kuntur Nasa (Oruro)

References 

Mountains of Potosí Department